In telecommunications, triple play service is a marketing term for the provisioning, over a single broadband connection, of two bandwidth-intensive services, broadband Internet access and television, and the latency-sensitive telephone.  Triple play focuses on a supplier convergence rather than solving technical issues or a common standard. However, standards like G.hn might deliver all these services on a common technology.

Quadruple play 

A so-called quadruple play (or quad play) service integrates mobility as well, often by supporting dual mode mobile plus hotspot-based phones that shift from GSM to Wi-Fi when they come in range of a home wired for triple-play service.  Typical Generic Access Network services of this kind, such as Rogers Home Calling Zone (Rogers is an incumbent in the Canadian market), allow the caller to enter and leave the range of their home Wi-Fi network, and only pay GSM rates for the time they spend outside the range. Calls at home are routed over the IP network and paid at a flat rate per month. No interruption or authorization for the shift is required—soft handoff takes place automatically as many times as the caller enters or leaves the range.

CATV

By about 2000, cable TV companies were in a technical position to offer triple play over one physical medium to a large number of their customers, as their networks already had sufficient bandwidth to carry hundreds of video channels. Cable's main competition for television in North America came from satellites, which could not compete for voice and interactive broadband due to the latency imposed by physical laws on a geosynchronous satellite—sometimes up to one full second of delay between speaking and being heard. Cable's main competition for voice and Internet access came from telcos, which were not yet able to compete for television in most markets because DSL over most local loops could not provide enough bandwidth.

As an interim marketing move while they installed fiber closer to the customer, telcos such as AT&T, Verizon, & Xfinity did co-promotion deals with satellite TV providers to sell television, telephone, and Internet access services bundled for billing purposes, although the services provided through a satellite link and the services provided through a phone line are not technically related. Telcos that own wireless phone networks also included those as part of such billing-only bundles because most cable companies do not own wireless networks.

Deployments 
The first triple-play deployment was by the US operator Cox Communications in 1997, delivered via a Hybrid fiber-coaxial network using digital and analog TV set top boxes, digital telephony devices from Arris International, and a cable modem system from Motorola.

Triple-play services in the United States are offered by cable television operators as well as by telecommunication operators, who directly compete with one another. Providers expect that an integrated solution will increase opportunity costs for customers who may want to choose between service providers, permit more cross-selling, and hold off the power companies deploying G.hn and IEEE P1901 technology with its radically superior service and deployment characteristics for at least another decade or so.

Outside the United States, notably in Ecuador, Pakistan, India, Japan, and China, power companies have generally been more successful in leapfrogging legacy technologies.  In Switzerland and Sweden, dark fiber is available reliably to homes at tariffed rates (in Switzerland four dark fibres are deployed to each home) supporting speeds in excess of 40 Gbit/s—only to the local caches, however, as backhaul cannot typically support more than 10 Mbit/s connections to global services.

Since 2007, access providers in Italy have been participating in an initiative called Fiber for Italy, which aims to build an infrastructure that can deliver 100 Mbit/s symmetrical bandwidth to consumers, in order to enable the delivery of triple- and quad-play services.

Other triple-play deployments include Deutsche Telekom, Vmedia, Telecom Italia, Swisscom, Telekom Austria, and Telus.

Regulation
There are multiple and intense regulatory battles over triple-play services, as incumbent telcos and incumbent cable operators attempt to keep out new competitors; since both industries historically have been regulated monopolies, regulatory capture has long been as much a core competency for them as have been prices and terms of service. Cable providers want to compete with telcos for local voice service, but want to discourage telcos from competing with them for television service. Incumbent telcos want to deliver television service but want to block competition for voice service from cable operators. Both industries cloak their demands for favorable regulatory treatment in claims that their positions favor the public interests.

In March 2007 cable operators scored a major victory when the Federal Communications Commission (FCC) overruled two state public service commissions by ruling that incumbent local exchange carriers must connect to VoIP services. Regulators in South Carolina and Nebraska had been allowing local telcos to block Time Warner Cable from offering local phone service in their states. In the other direction, also in March 2007, the FCC limited the powers of municipalities and states over telcos that want to compete with cable TV companies. Consumer groups expressed displeasure with this FCC ruling because they fear telcos will only offer service to the richest neighborhoods, which is a major point of contention between telcos wanting to offer television service and local governments is that local governments typically impose "build-out" and community access requirements so a cable provider is forced to wire the entire town within a specified period of time. All three Republican members of the FCC voted for this decision, while both Democratic members voted against it and one predicted either U.S. Congress or the courts would overturn it.  In October 2007, the Hartford Courant reported that Connecticut regulators have ordered AT&T to stop signing up new customers for its IPTV service until they got a cable license; AT&T said they would fight this decision in court.

Telco
For telephone local exchange carriers (LEC), triple play is delivered using a combination of optical fiber and digital subscriber line (DSL) technologies (called fiber in the loop) to its residential base. This configuration uses fiber communications to reach distant locations and uses DSL over an existing POTS twisted pair cable as last mile access to the subscriber's home. Cable television operators use a similar architecture called hybrid fibre coaxial (HFC) to provide subscriber homes with broadband, but use the available coaxial cable rather than a twisted pair for the last mile transmission standard. Subscriber homes can be in a residential environment, multi-dwelling units, or even in business offices.

Using DSL over twisted pair, television content is delivered using IPTV where the content is streamed to the subscriber in an MPEG-2 transport format. On an HFC network, television may be a mixture of analog and digital television signals. A set-top box (STB) is used at the subscriber's home to allow the subscriber to control viewing and order new video services such as "movies on demand". Access to the Internet is provided through Asynchronous Transfer Mode or DOCSIS, typically provided as an Ethernet port to the subscriber. Voice service can be provided using a traditional plain old telephone service (POTS) interface as part of the legacy telephone network or can be delivered using voice over IP (VoIP). In an HFC network, voice is delivered using VoIP.

Some service providers are also rolling out Ethernet to the home networks and fiber to the home, which support triple-play services and bypass the disadvantages of adapting broadband transmission to a legacy network. This is particularly common in greenfield developments where the capital expenditure is reduced by deploying one network to deliver all services.

For existing multiple-dwelling-unit (MDU) buildings, where running fiber to each unit may not be feasible, telcos often use VDSL to connect individual units over existing copper through a central optical network terminal located in the existing telco closet. Over such a short distance, DSL can deliver much higher bitrates than is possible running DSL over the local loop from the nearest central office (as is common with basic DSL).

Wireless 
Triple play has led to the term "quadruple play", where wireless communications is introduced as another medium to deliver video, Internet access, and voice telephone service. Advances in both CDMA and GSM standards, utilizing 3G, 4G, or UMTS allows the service operators to enter into quadruple play and gain competitive advantage against other providers. The grouping together of services (as triple or quadruple play) is called multi-play.

Other advanced technologies such as WiMax or 802.16 has allowed new market entrants to achieve triple play. Many speculate that this means serious, new competition for established providers of bundled telecommunications services.

Power integration 
These services can be delivered with a BPL network using technologies such as IEEE P1901/G.hn.  Since the devices all rely on AC power (or DC power via 802.3af or 802.3at which rely on AC power at the PoE hub), connecting them with only one cable each for both power and gigabit data cuts wiring costs, and most rooms are already wired for power.

Business
The challenges in offering triple play are mostly associated with determining the right business model, backend processes, customer care support, and economic environment, rather than technology. For example, using the right billing platform to address a variety of subscriber demographics or having the appropriate subscriber density to financially justify introduction of the service are a few factors that affect decisions to offer triple play.

In addition to the challenges mentioned above, there are a number of technical challenges with regards to the rollout of triple-play services. Voice, video, and high-speed data all have different characteristics and place different burdens on the network that provides access to these services. Voice services are greatly affected by jitter, whereas packet loss has a greater effect on video and data services. In order to use a shared network resource such as cable or DSL, the service provider may use network equipment that employs quality-of-service mechanisms to adjust to the requirements of the different services.

See also
 Technological convergence
 IPTV
 Voice over IP
 Telecommunication convergence
 Cable television in the United States

References

External links 
 How to test Triple Play Services
 Triple Play: Building the converged network for IP, VoIP and IPTV
 TheTriple Play: Best Internet Service Providers
 Triple Play Xfinity Service

Digital television
Fiber to the premises
Net neutrality
Telecommunication services